David Hajdu (born March 1955) is an American columnist, author and professor at Columbia University Graduate School of Journalism. He was the music critic for The New Republic for 12 years and is music editor at The Nation.

Biography
Hajdu is of Hungarian and Italian descent, and was born and raised in Phillipsburg, New Jersey, he attended New York University, where he majored in journalism.

His first professional work was illustrating for The Easton Express in 1972. He started writing for The Village Voice and Rolling Stone in 1979, and was the founding editor of Video Review magazine, where he worked from 1980 to 1984. In the late 1980s he began teaching at The New School, and was an editor at Entertainment Weekly from 1990 to 1999. He was the music critic for The New Republic for 12 years and is music editor at The Nation.

He has taught at the University of Chicago (as nonfiction writer in residence), Syracuse University, and Columbia University, where he is a professor of journalism.

He has written biographies and other nonfiction about the musicians Billy Strayhorn, Joan Baez, Bob Dylan, Mimi Baez Farina, and Richard Farina.  He has also written about comic books.

In October, 2021, President Joe Biden nominated Hajdu to serve a six year term on the National Endowment for the Humanities.

Awards

1997 ASCAP-Deems Taylor Award: Lush Life: A Biography of Billy Strayhorn
2002 ASCAP-Deems Taylor Award: Positively 4th Street: The Lives and Times of Joan Baez, Bob Dylan, Mimi Baez Farina and Richard Farina
Finalist, National Book Critics Circle Award: Positively 4th Street: The Lives and Times of Joan Baez, Bob Dylan, Mimi Baez Farina and Richard Farina
Finalist, Firecracker Book Award: Positively 4th Street: The Lives and Times of Joan Baez, Bob Dylan, Mimi Baez Farina and Richard Farina
2010 ASCAP-Deems Taylor Award: Heroes and Villains: Essays on Music, Movies, Comics, and Culture

Bibliography
All books published by Farrar, Straus and Giroux, New York, unless otherwise noted.

References

External links

 
 

1955 births
Living people
American non-fiction writers
New York University alumni
People from Phillipsburg, New Jersey
The Nation (U.S. magazine) people
Rolling Stone people
The Village Voice people
American writers of Italian descent
American people of Hungarian descent
EC Comics